Gordon Brand Jnr  (19 August 1958 – 31 July 2019) was a Scottish professional golfer. He played on the European Tour, winning eight times, and later the European Senior Tour, winning twice.  He played in the 1979 Walker Cup and played twice in the Ryder Cup, in 1987 and 1989.

Early life and amateur career
Brand was born in Kirkcaldy. His father, Gordon Brand Snr, was the club professional at Knowle Golf Club in Bristol from 1969 to 2001. Brand had a successful amateur career and played for Great Britain and Ireland in the 1979 Walker Cup and in the Eisenhower Trophy in 1978 and 1980. He turned professional in July 1981, with a handicap of plus 1, after failing to make the 1981 Walker Cup team.

Professional career
Brand quickly achieved success as a professional. He won the European Tour Qualifying School in November 1981, and went on to win two European Tour events in his rookie season, and being named the Sir Henry Cotton Rookie of the Year for 1982. He went on to accumulate eight wins on the tour in total, the last of them in 1993. He also won the 1988 West End South Australian Open. He made the top ten on the European Tour Order of Merit six times, with a best placing of fourth in 1987. He last made the top one hundred on the Order of Merit in the 2000 season, during which he was runner-up to Ian Poulter in the Italian Open at the age of 42. He continued to play regularly on the tour until 2006.

In the first round of the 1986 Jersey Open he set a European Tour record by making four eagles in a single round.

Brand's two Ryder Cup appearances were in 1987, when Europe won on American soil for the first time, and in 1989 when Europe retained the trophy at The Belfry by tying the match 14 all. Brand had a 2–4–1 win–loss–half record, including one half and one loss in his singles matches. He represented Scotland in the Alfred Dunhill Cup and World Cup many times. Playing with Sam Torrance in the 1984 World Cup of Golf in Italy, Scotland finished joint runners-up behind Spain. Brand had the second best individual score. Brand played in the Open Championship 18 times. His best finish was when was tied for 5th place in 1992, having been tied for second place after two rounds.

After reaching 50, Brand played on the European Senior Tour where he won twice, the 2010 Matrix Jersey Classic and the 2013 WINSTONgolf Senior Open. His best season was 2010 where he had a win and two runner-up finishes to finish 4th in the Order of Merit. He was twice runner-up in the PGA Seniors Championship, in 2008 and 2011, both at Slaley Hall. In 2008, in his first event as a senior, he tied with English golfer Gordon J. Brand after 72 holes, but lost at the sixth hole of a sudden-death playoff. Gordon J. Brand used his middle initial to distinguish himself from Gordon Brand Jnr.

Death
Brand at the age of 60 died suddenly from a heart attack on 31 July 2019 at the London Golf Club in Ash, Kent following a practice round for the Staysure PGA Senior Championship.

Amateur wins
1978 Brabazon Trophy
1979 British Youths Open Amateur Championship, Swedish International Stroke Play Championship
1980 Scottish Youths' Amateur Open Stroke Play Championship, Scottish Amateur Open Stroke Play Championship, Golf Illustrated Gold Vase
1981 Portuguese Amateur Open Championship, Sunningdale Foursomes (with Alan Lyddon)

Professional wins (11)

European Tour wins (8)

European Tour playoff record (1–1)

PGA Tour of Australasia wins (1)

European Senior Tour wins (2)

European Senior Tour playoff record (0–2)

Results in major championships

CUT = missed the half-way cut
"T" indicates a tie for a place
Note: Brand never played in the Masters Tournament or the PGA Championship.

Results in senior major championships

"T" indicates a tie for a place
CUT = missed the halfway cut
Note: Brand only played in the Senior PGA Championship and the Senior British Open Championship.

Team appearances
Amateur
St Andrews Trophy (representing Great Britain & Ireland): 1976 (winners), 1978 (winners), 1980 (winners)
European Amateur Team Championship (representing  Scotland): 1979
Eisenhower Trophy (representing Great Britain & Ireland): 1978, 1980
Walker Cup (representing Great Britain & Ireland): 1979

Professional
World Cup (representing Scotland): 1984, 1985, 1988, 1989, 1990, 1992, 1994
Dunhill Cup (representing Scotland): 1985, 1986, 1987, 1988, 1989, 1991, 1992, 1993, 1994, 1997
Four Tours World Championship (representing Europe): 1985, 1988, 1989
Ryder Cup (representing Europe): 1987 (winners), 1989 (tied, cup retained)

See also
List of golfers with most European Tour wins

References

External links

Scottish male golfers
European Tour golfers
European Senior Tour golfers
Ryder Cup competitors for Europe
Sportspeople from Kirkcaldy
Sportspeople from Bristol
1958 births
2019 deaths